Archibald J. Thomas Jr. (December 25, 1923 – December 21, 2004) was an American politician in the state of Florida. Thomas was born in Lake Butler, Florida, the son of Archibald J. Thomas, also a former member of the Florida House of Representatives. He attended the University of Florida where he earned an LL.B. degree.  Thomas served in the Florida House of Representatives from 1961 to 1966, as a Democrat, representing Bradford County. He died on December 21, 2004.

References

1923 births
2004 deaths
Democratic Party members of the Florida House of Representatives
People from Bradford County, Florida
People from Lake Butler, Florida
University of Florida alumni
20th-century American politicians